Munsha Singh Dukhi (1 July 1890 – 26 January 1971) was an Indian national revolutionary and poet, who fought for the Independence of India from the British Empire. He belonged to the Ghadar Party. He was tried under third Lahore Conspiracy Case trial.

Life
He was born on 1 July 1890 at Jandiala, in Jalandhar district of the British Punjab. He had his education informally, and acquired a good working knowledge of English, Urdu, Bengali, and Hindi.

See also
Lahore Conspiracy Case trial
Ghadar Party
Kartar Singh Sarabha
Hindu–German Conspiracy

References

Other sources
 Ghadar Party Da Itihas, Desh Bhagat Yaadgar Hall Committee, Jullundur
 Unpublished Account of Ghadar Party Conspiracy Cases, 1914-1918 by Isemonger and Slattery

Ghadar Party
1971 deaths
Revolutionary movement for Indian independence
Indian revolutionaries
Punjabi people
Indian Sikhs
People from Jalandhar
1890 births